Malene Degn (born 2 December 1996) is a Danish cyclist. 

She won the Danish national championships in cyclo cross in 2017 and 2018. She was named MTB Rider of the Year at the 2017 Danish Bike Awards. She was selected for the Danish team for the Cycling at the 2020 Summer Olympics – Women's cross-country race.

References

1996 births
Living people
Danish female cyclists
Place of birth missing (living people)
Olympic cyclists of Denmark
Cyclists at the 2020 Summer Olympics
Cyclists from Copenhagen
21st-century Danish women